Qasem Qeshlaqi (also Romanized as Qāsem Qeshlāqī; also known as Moghānlū) is a village in Yurchi-ye Sharqi Rural District, Kuraim District, Nir County, Ardabil Province, Iran. At the 2006 census, its population was 37, in 6 families.

References 

Towns and villages in Nir County